Jermu Gustafsson (born 22 June 1986) is a Finnish former footballer and current coach of the A Youth of FC Inter Turku.

Career
He played during his career for FC Inter Turku, VG-62 and FF Jaro.

International career
Gustafsson is member of the Finland national under-21 football team. He was captain of Finland team in the 2003 FIFA U-17 World Championship, which were held in Finland.

References

1986 births
Living people
Finnish footballers
FF Jaro players
FC Inter Turku players
Footballers from Turku
Association football defenders
Bollklubben-46 players